Shubhaavi Choksey is an Indian television actress known for playing Meera Singhania in Kyunki Saas Bhi Kabhi Bahu Thi, Rishika Rai Choudhary in Kahaani Ghar Ghar Kii and Mohini Basu in Kasautii Zindagii Kay. She is also a trained Bharatnatyam dancer for almost 10 years.

Personal life
She married Harshal Choksey on 25 November 2007.

Filmography

Films

Television

Web series

References

External links
 

Living people
Indian television actresses
Actresses from Mumbai
Actresses in Hindi cinema
21st-century Indian actresses
Indian film actresses
Actresses in Hindi television
Year of birth missing (living people)